Schizothecium miniglutinans is a species of coprophilous fungus in the family Lasiosphaeriaceae. It is known to grow in the dung of goats and possibly on that of sheep.

References

External links

Fungi described in 1972
Fungi of Greece
Sordariales